Gazi Medical College Hospital  (GMCH) is the first private medical College in Khulna, Division of Bangladesh, established in 1986.Its former name was Khulna Surgical and Medical Hospital.Later, in 2011 it became a medical college.Now it is a 500 bedded hospital alongside a reputable medical college with 11 different academic departments. It is located in Sonadanga, Khulna and is half a kilometre away from the main city bus station.It is affiliated with Rajshahi University as well as Rajshahi Medical University under the Faculty of Medicine.

It offers a five-year course of study leading to a Bachelor of Medicine, Bachelor of Surgery (MBBS) degree. A one-year internship after graduation is compulsory for all graduates. The degree is recognized by the Bangladesh Medical and Dental Council.

The college is associated with 500-bed Gazi Medical College Hospital. Mediscope is the official journal of Gazi Medical College.

History
Gazi Mizanur Rahman founded Gazi Medical College in 2011. Instruction began in 2012.

The Bachelor of Medicine, Bachelor of Surgery (MBBS) degree program is divided into Four parts by the first, second,third and Final professional examinations. If a student fail one of these exams, they may sit it again six months later. Previously Under the 2002 "carry on" system, students were permitted to attend the classes in the next academic session while preparing to retake an exam. That system was strongly favored by medical students, but strongly opposed by their teachers. The Bangladesh Medical and Dental Council eliminated "carry on" system in 2013, after which students who failed a professional exam were not allowed to continue classes until they had passed it, causing them to lose up to a year in the process.

Campus
The college is located in Sonadanga Thana, Khulna Bangladesh. It has an associated 500-bed hospital, the erstwhile Khulna Surgical and Medical Hospital, which became Gazi Medical College Hospital in 2011.

Organization and administration
The college is affiliated with Rajshahi University under the Faculty of Medicine. The founder chairman of the college is Gazi Mizanur Rahman. The principal is Prof.Dr. Banga Kamal Basu. The college is approved by the Indian Medical Council (MCI) and the Nepal Medical Council (NMC).

Academics
The college offers a five-year course of study, approved by the Bangladesh Medical and Dental Council (BMDC), leading to a Bachelor of Medicine, Bachelor of Surgery (MBBS) degree from Rajshahi University. After passing the final professional examination, there is a compulsory one-year internship. The internship is a prerequisite for obtaining registration from the BMDC to practice medicine. The academic calendar runs from January through December. In October 2014, the Ministry of Health and Family Welfare capped admission and tuition fees at private medical colleges at 1,990,000 Bangladeshi taka (US$25,750 as of 2014) total for their five-year courses applicable for Bangladeshi students.

Admission for Bangladeshis to the MBBS programmes at all medical colleges in Bangladesh (government and private) is conducted centrally by the Directorate General of Health Services (DGHS). It administers a written multiple choice question exam simultaneously throughout the country. Candidates are admitted based primarily on their score on this test, although grades at Secondary School Certificate (SSC) and Higher Secondary School Certificate (HSC) level also play a part. Admission for foreign students is based on their SSC and HSC equivalent to O/10 Level and A/12 Level/grades. As of December 2015, the college is allowed to admit 100 students annually.
Mediscope is the official journal of Gazi Medical College.

See also
 List of medical colleges in Bangladesh

References

External links 
 

Medical colleges in Bangladesh
Education in Khulna
Hospitals in Bangladesh
Educational institutions established in 2011
2011 establishments in Bangladesh
Educational institutions of Khulna Division